Joseph "Buddy" Eilers (born January 19, 1939) was a Canadian football player who played for the Saskatchewan Roughriders and Hamilton Tiger-Cats. He previously played college football at Texas A&M University.

References

1939 births
Saskatchewan Roughriders players
Living people
Texas A&M University alumni